The Rabindra Museum is a museum located in Mungpoo, near Kalimpong, in the state of West Bengal, India. Poet Rabindranath Tagore stayed in this house in 1938 and 1939, at the invitation of poet and novelist Maitreyi Devi, the wife of quinologist dr. M.M.Sen.

On 13 April 2011, it was damaged when a tree fell during a storm.

References

External links
 Mungpoo.org. Rabindranath Tagore photos, paintings inside Ravindra Memorial Museum Mungpoo 

Museums in West Bengal
Buildings and structures in Darjeeling district
Education in Darjeeling district
Tourist attractions in Darjeeling district